Felix Baffoe (born 26 December 1991) is a Ghanaian football player.

Career 
Baffoe began his career with Liberty Professionals FC and joined in Mai 2008 on loan to Zaytuna F.C. In May 2008 the loan deal ended and he signed a contract with Accra Hearts of Oak.

International 
Baffoe holds one cap for the Black Stars.

Career statistics

International

Statistics accurate as of match played 30 May 2003

References 

1991 births
Living people
Ghanaian footballers
Ghanaian expatriate footballers
Association football forwards
Liberty Professionals F.C. players
Accra Hearts of Oak S.C. players
Zaytuna F.C. players
Ghana international footballers
Tajikistan Higher League players